Uroplakin-2 (UP2) is a protein that in humans is encoded by the UPK2 gene.

References

Further reading

Uroplakins